William Northey FRS (c. 1722 – 24 December 1770) was an English politician who sat in the House of Commons from 1747 to 1770.

He was the son of William Northey of  Compton Basset, Wiltshire and his wife Abigail Webster, the daughter of Sir Thomas Webster, 1st Baronet of Battle Abbey, Sussex. His father had been MP for Calne in 1713 and for Wootton Bassett in 1714.

In 1747 Northey bought the prebend manor of Ivy House, near Chippenham, Wiltshire, which carried one of the two Parliamentary seats for Calne and was duly elected a Member of Parliament (MP) for Calne on 27 June 1747, holding the seat until 1761. He was then elected MP for Maidstone, Kent on 28 March 1761 and held the seat until 18 March 1768. He was lastly elected MP for Great Bedwyn on 13 November 1768 and held the seat until his death in 1770. He was described as a leading and eloquent member of the opposition in parliament.

Northey was a lieutenant-colonel in the Wiltshire county militia and one of the commissioners for trade. He became a Fellow of the Royal Society on 21 June 1753. He was Groom of the Chamber to King George III.

He was a Lord of Trade from 1770 until his death at Ivy House later that year.

Northey had married twice: firstly Harriet (died 1750), the daughter of Robert Vyner of Gautby, Lincolnshire and secondly (in 1751) Anne Hopkins, daughter of Edward Hopkins, MP, Secretary of State for Ireland. He had 3 sons and 4 daughters. His eldest son William also became an MP. His youngest son Richard changed his surname to Northey Hopkins. His four daughters died unmarried.

References

1722 births
1770 deaths
People from Wiltshire
Members of the Parliament of Great Britain for English constituencies
British MPs 1761–1768
British MPs 1747–1754
British MPs 1754–1761
Fellows of the Royal Society